All Elite Wrestling is an American professional wrestling promotion and entertainment company based in Jacksonville, Florida. Former employees in AEW consist of professional wrestlers, managers, valets, play-by-play and color commentators, announcers, interviewers, referees, trainers, script writers, executives, and members of the board of directors.

They primarily appeared on AEW television programming, pay-per-views, and live events. When talent is released of their contract, it could due to retirement, personal reasons, time off, budget cuts, the individual may have asked for their release or their contract was not renewed. In one case, a talent has died while they were contracted, such as Mr. Brodie Lee.

Those who made appearances without a contract and those who were previously released but are currently employed by AEW are not included.

Personnel

References

External links

Former personnel
 
All Elite Wrestling alumni